Hastière is a municipality of Wallonia located in the province of Namur, Belgium. 

On 1 January 2006 the municipality had 5,230 inhabitants.

The municipality consists of the following districts: Agimont, Blaimont, Hastière-Lavaux (location of town hall), Hastière-par-delà, Heer, Hermeton-sur-Meuse, and Waulsort.

Hastière's attractions along the river Meuse include the Romanesque church of a former Benedictine Monastery (at Hastière-Lavaux), the Renaissance Castle of Freÿr surrounded by 18th-century classical gardens and facing the rocks of Freÿr (north of Waulsort), and the 17th-century buildings of another former Benedictine monastery (at Waulsort).

See also
 List of protected heritage sites in Hastière

References

External links 
 
 http://www.hastiere.be
 map

Municipalities of Namur (province)
Wallonia's Major Heritage
Burial sites of the House of Ardennes-Verdun